Gong Ji-cheol (born July 10, 1979), better known by his stage name Gong Yoo, is a South Korean actor. He is best known for his roles in the television dramas Coffee Prince (2007), Guardian: The Lonely and Great God (2016–2017), The Silent Sea (2021), and Squid Game (2021), and the films Silenced (2011), Train to Busan (2016) and The Age of Shadows (2016).

His stage name is a combination of his father's family name "Gong" and of his mother's family name "Yoo".

Early life and education
Gong was born Gong Ji-cheol on July 10, 1979 in Busan, South Korea. Gong's father attended Busan Sango, a baseball academy, and was a manager of the Lotte Giants from 1983 to 1985. Gong attended Dongin High School, and pursued undergraduate studies at Kyung Hee University's Department of Theater and Film.

In 2017, it was revealed that Gong Yoo is a descendant of Chinese philosopher Confucius, and is part of the 79th generation among Confucius's descendants originated from the Gokbu Gong clan.

Career

2001–2004: beginnings
Gong Yoo graduated from Kyung Hee University with a B.A. degree in theater. In 2000, he started his show business career as a video jockey on Mnet and debuted as an actor in the TV series School 4 in 2001. Thereafter, Gong did a number of supporting roles in dramas and movies and also hosted the music program Music Camp in 2004.

2005–2007: Coffee Prince and breakthrough
In 2005, he landed his first lead role in SBS's Hello My Teacher opposite Gong Hyo-jin. This was followed by the romance melodrama One Fine Day in 2006.

Gong Yoo was then cast in MBC's romantic comedy Coffee Prince, which became his breakout role. The popularity of the drama not only solidified his status as a leading man, but also made him a hallyu star.

2008–2015: military enlistment and comeback

On January 14, 2008, Gong Yoo enlisted for the mandatory service, and was discharged on December 8, 2009. He did 8 months of frontline active service in Cheorwon and was transferred to the Defense Media Agency, where he served in the public relations department and hosted as a DJ for the army radio station.

He made his comeback in the romantic comedy Finding Mr. Destiny, which was a medium box office hit in Korea.
He then initiated and pursued the production of a theatrical adaptation of Gong Ji-young's novel The Crucible, a congratulatory gift from his senior for his promotion during enlistment. This movie was internationally released under the title Silenced. Upon its release on September 22, 2011, the film sparked public outrage. This led to a reopening of the investigations into the incidents on which the novel and film are based. Public demand for legislative reform reached the National Assembly, where a revised bill to target sex crimes against minors and the disabled, dubbed the Dogani Bill after the Korean title of the film, was successfully passed in late October 2011.Gong Yoo then starred opposite Lee Min-jung in the romantic-comedy series Big written by the Hong sisters. The drama was well-received, although it was criticized for its ending.
In 2013, he returned to the big screen after a two-year gap in the movie The Suspect. He played an elite North Korean spy who defects after being betrayed by his country.
In November 2013, Gong Yoo was appointed as a special representative of the United Nations Children's Fund (UNICEF) in Korea, in conjunction with a celebration of the 24th year since the Convention on the Rights of the Child (CRC) was adopted. Following his appointment, he has visited countries around the world to raise awareness of the situation of children in underdeveloped countries.

On July 7, 2014, Gong Yoo was named as an ambassador for the National Tax Service (NTS), alongside actress Ha Ji-won. The pair modeled for promotional posters and took part in street campaigns that encourage honest tax payment in support of the NTS.

2016–present: career resurgence
Gong Yoo experienced a new high in his career with consecutive hit works in 2016. His first film in 2016 was the melodrama A Man and a Woman alongside Jeon Do-yeon. He then starred in the hugely successful zombie blockbuster Train to Busan, which surpassed 11 million admissions in South Korea. He then starred in another box office hit The Age of Shadows, which surpassed 6 million admissions in two weeks.In December 2016, Gong Yoo returned to television in Kim Eun-sook's fantasy-romance drama Guardian: The Lonely and Great God, playing the titular goblin. The drama was a massive hit and Gong won Best Actor at the Baeksang Awards for his performance.

In 2018, Gong Yoo was cast in the feminist film Kim Ji-young: Born 1982, which is his third collaboration with actress Jung Yu-mi (after Silenced and Train to Busan), Gong plays the role of Kim Ji-young's husband.

In March 2020, Gong Yoo confirmed to make a special appearance in Kim Tae-yong's upcoming film Wonderland,

In 2021, Gong Yoo starred in Lee Yong-ju's action thriller film Seo Bok alongside Park Bo-gum. Gong plays a former intelligence agent who is caught up in the chase of catching the first human clone to uncover the secret to eternal life. That year, he appeared as a recruiter salesman in Squid Game.

In December 2021, Gong Yoo appeared as team leader Han Yoon-jae alongside Bae Doona,  Lee Joon, Kim Sun-young, and others in the Netflix original sci-fi thriller series The Silent Sea. Set in a distant dystopian future where Earth faces acute water shortage, the series follows an expedition team to an abandoned station on the moon. The fan response to the series was mixed, but it topped Netflix’s global charts to become the most-watched non-English series in its second week. The Forbes review called it one of Netflix’s “best sci-fi series to date.”

Filmography

Film

Television series

Web series

Music video appearances

Hosting

Discography

Awards and nominations

State honors

Listicles

References

External links

 Gong Yoo at Management Soop
 
 
 

IHQ (company) artists
South Korean male television actors
South Korean male film actors
South Korean male models
South Korean Roman Catholics
Kyung Hee University alumni
1979 births
Living people
21st-century South Korean male actors
South Korean people of Chinese descent
Male actors from Busan